Operation Big Buzz was a U.S. military entomological warfare field test conducted in the U.S. state of Georgia in 1955. The tests involved dispersing over 300,000 mosquitoes from aircraft and through ground dispersal methods.

Operation
Operation Big Buzz occurred in June 1955 in the U.S. state of Georgia. The operation was a field test designed to determine the feasibility of producing, storing, loading into munitions, and dispersing from aircraft the yellow fever mosquito (though these were not infected for the test) (Aedes aegypti). The second goal of the operation was to determine whether the mosquitoes would survive their dispersion and seek meals on the ground. Around 330,000 uninfected mosquitoes were dropped from aircraft in E14 bombs and dispersed from the ground. In total about one million female mosquitoes were bred for the testing; remaining mosquitoes were used in munitions loading and storage tests.

Results
They were also active in seeking blood meals from humans and guinea pigs.

See also
Operation Big Itch
Operation Drop Kick
Operation May Day

References

Big Buzz
Big Buzz
Big Buzz
Big Buzz
1955 in the United States